Straus Family Creamery is a California organic dairy, located in Marshall in Marin County. They produce whole milk, reduced and non-fat milk (pasteurized, but not homogenized), butter, cheese, ice cream and yogurt. Their milk is used in the production of cheese at Cowgirl Creamery. Their milk is commonly sold in redeemable glass containers.

In 2021, the company moved its production from Marshall to a larger facility in Rohnert Park, California.

References

External links

Food and drink in the San Francisco Bay Area
Companies based in Marin County, California
Organic farming in the United States
1994 establishments in California
Dairy products companies in California
Yogurt companies